Public holidays in Syria consist of a variety of cultural, nationalistic, and religious holidays.

The primary national holiday in Syria is the Independence Day, celebrated on 17 April of every year, which celebrates the evacuation of the last French troops in Syria, officially ending the French Mandate for Syria.

Other important holidays include the anniversary of the October War on 6 October, Martyrs' Day on 6 May commemorating the execution of many Syrian nationalists by the Ottomans, and Armed Forces Day on the first of August celebrating the creation of the Syrian Armed Forces.

List of public holidays

See also
History of Syria

 
Syria
Holidays